Justice Clayton or Judge Clayton may refer to:

Boyce G. Clayton (1929–2020), associate justice of the Kentucky Supreme Court
John M. Clayton (1796–1856), chief justice of the Delaware Superior Court
Preston C. Clayton (1903–1996), associate justice of the Alabama Supreme Court
Thomas Clayton (1777–1854), chief justice of the Delaware Supreme Court

See also

 Clayton (disambiguation)